Sir James Hill, 1st Baronet (11 March 1849 – 17 January 1936) was a British Liberal Party politician.

He was founder of Sir James Hill and Son, wool merchants in 1891 and was elected Lord Mayor of Bradford for 1908–09. He was elected unopposed as member of parliament (MP) for Bradford Central at a by-election in 1916, following the death of the Liberal MP Sir George Scott Robertson. He was made a baronet in January 1917, of Bradford, but at the 1918 general election the "coalition coupon" went to his Conservative Party opponent Henry Butler Ratcliffe, who won the seat. After his defeat, Hill did not stand for Parliament again.

He died in 1936. He had married Alice Knight, daughter of Joshua Knight and was succeeded by their son Albert.

References

External links 
 

1849 births
1936 deaths
Liberal Party (UK) MPs for English constituencies
UK MPs 1910–1918
Baronets in the Baronetage of the United Kingdom
Mayors of Bradford